Rabbids Invasion is a French computer-animated television series based on Ubisoft's Raving Rabbids video game series. It is a co-production of Ubisoft Motion Pictures, TeamTO and CNC. The show was developed by Jean-Louis Momus, and stars Damien Laquet as the voice of the Rabbids.

The show premiered on 3 August 2013 on France 3. The first three seasons, each with 26 episodes, aired between 2013 and 2017. A fourth season aired on France 3 in 2018 and it was released worldwide through Netflix on 1 July 2019. An hour-long follow-up after the fourth season, titled Rabbids Invasion: Mission to Mars, premiered in France on 29 September 2021 and on Netflix as an original film on February 18, 2022.

Episodes

Production 
In October 2010, Ubisoft and Aardman announced a partnership to produce a TV series pilot and several shorts based on Ubisoft's Raving Rabbids franchise. The following year, it was announced that 78 animated episodes would be made by Ubisoft's Montreuil-based studio Ubisoft Motion Pictures as its first in-house production. In the United States, the series premiered on Nickelodeon on 3 August 2013. On 17 December 2013, the series was renewed for a second season of 26 half-hour blocks, with three segments per block. On 16 June 2015, it was renewed for a third season.

A fourth season was announced in July 2018. This season was not aired by Nickelodeon, and it instead aired on France 3 and Netflix.

Broadcast 

The series airs on France 3 in France. In China, Rabbids Invasion ranked as the most-watched children's television series in 2017, having gathered over a billion views. Disney Channel Asia premiered the fourth season of Rabbids Invasion on 8 July 2019.

In the United States, from 3 August 2013 onward, the first season (and several episodes of the second season) aired on Nickelodeon. The rest of the second season and all of the third season aired only on the Nicktoons channel. The fourth season was not aired in the United States until Netflix released it in July 2019.

Reception 
Emily Ashby of Common Sense Media gave the show two out of five stars, stating: "Rabbids Invasion tones down the violence for the characters' jump from gaming to the TV, but they still have a lot of fun at the expense of each other and unsuspecting bystanders, and a lot of their antics would be frowned upon in the real world (using chickens' buttocks as egg shooters in a mock battle, for instance). Ultimately, though, it's crude and minimally taxing on viewers' sense of comprehension, so for better or worse, it's bound to appeal to the grade-school set."

Video game 
Rabbids Invasion was adapted into an interactive TV series, titled Rabbids Invasion: The Interactive TV Show. The game which combines existing television episodes with a series of challenges, was released on Xbox 360, Xbox One, and PlayStation 4 in November 2014, requiring a Kinect or PlayStation Camera, respectively.

See also
 Rayman: The Animated Series
 Rabbids Invasion: Mission to Mars

References

External links 
  at Ubisoft
 
 

2013 French television series debuts
2019 French television series endings
2010s French animated television series
Animated series based on video games
English-language Netflix original programming
French children's animated comedy television series
French computer-animated television series
French-language Netflix original programming
Rabbids
Works based on Ubisoft video games
Animated television series about rabbits and hares
Television series revived after cancellation